Pamela Kasabiiti Mbabazi (born 6 April 1969) is a Ugandan university professor, academic, and academic administrator, who currently serves as the Chairperson of the National Planning Authority of Uganda. She was installed in that position in April 2019, to serve a five-year term, renewable one time.

She previously served as the deputy vice-chancellor of Mbarara University of Science and Technology (MUST). She was appointed to that position in 2010, for a renewable five-year term.

Background and education
Mbabazi was born Pamela Kasabiiti, in Mbarara, Uganda, on 6 April 1969. She attended elementary schools in the Mbarara metropolitan area, before transferring to Kigezi High School for her O-Level studies. She moved to Bweranyangi Girls' Senior Secondary School in Bushenyi for her A-Level education.

In 1987, she entered Makerere University, Uganda's oldest and largest institution of higher education, graduating in 1990 with a Bachelor of Arts in economics and political science. She continued with her education at the University of Leeds, where she earned a Master of Arts in development studies in 1992. She earned a Master of Science in development planning and management from the Kwame Nkrumah University of Science and Technology in Kumasi, Ghana. Her doctorate degree in development studies was obtained in 2005 from Mbarara University of Science and Technology.

Work experience
Since 1998, Mbabazi has served as the dean of the Faculty of Development Studies at Mbarara University. She is credited for setting up the faculty and developing curricula for the degree courses in development studies and business administration. The faculty has now been amalgamated into the university's Institute of Management Science. In 2010, she was appointed as deputy vice chancellor at MUST, replacing Jonathan Baranga who returned to the Faculty of Science. in April 2019, she was sworn-in as the new Chairperson of the National Planning Authority of Uganda, replacing Professor Wilberforce Kisamba Mugerwa, who served in that role from 2008 until 2018.

Personal life
Mbabazi is married to  Ivan Mbabazi Batuma. Together, they are the parents of two children.

See also
 List of universities in Uganda
 List of university leaders in Uganda

Succession table as deputy vice chancellor of Mbarara University

References

External links
 Website of Mbarara University
The Deputy Vice Chancellor - Associate Professor Pamela Mbabazi
The Inspirational Women of Uganda

Living people
Makerere University alumni
Alumni of the University of Leeds
Mbarara University alumni
Kwame Nkrumah University of Science and Technology alumni
Academic staff of Mbarara University
People educated at Bweranyangi Girls' Senior Secondary School
1969 births
People from Mbarara